"Joan of Arc" is a World War I song written in 1917. Singer Henry Burr performed the song. In September 1917, it reached the number two spot on the US song charts.

References

1917 songs
Songs of World War I
Songs about Joan of Arc